Blastobasis acirfa is a moth in the  family Blastobasidae. It is found in Kenya. The habitat consists of coastal lowlands and the western highlands.

The length of the forewings is 5.9–9.3 mm. The forewings are brownish grey intermixed with pale brownish grey scales, brownish grey scales tipped with pale brownish grey and brown scales. The hindwings are grey.

The larvae feed on Manilkara butugi, Mimusops bagshawei, Olea welwitschii, Olea woodiana disjuncta, Prunus africana, Synsepalum cerasiferum and Tiliacora funifera.

Etymology
The species epithet, acirfa, refers to the name of the continent in which this species is known to occur, but spelled backward.

References

Endemic moths of Kenya
Moths described in 2010
Blastobasis
Moths of Africa